Veli Veikko Koota (born September 14, 1957 in Kankaanpää) is a retired male boxer from Finland, who represented his native country at the 1980 Summer Olympics in Moscow, Soviet Union. There he lost in the third round of the men's bantamweight (– 54 kg) division to Venezuela's eventual silver medalist Bernardo Piñango.

References
 Veli Koota at Sports Reference

1957 births
Living people
People from Kankaanpää
Bantamweight boxers
Boxers at the 1980 Summer Olympics
Olympic boxers of Finland
Finnish male boxers
Sportspeople from Satakunta